Mi vida eres tú (English title: You are my life) is a 2006 telenovela developed by Verónica Suárez and produced by Cisneros Media Distribution in Miami, Florida.

Scarlet Ortiz and Jorge Aravena starred as the main protagonists, while Paola Toyos, Roberto Palazuelos, and Fernando Carrera starred as antagonists.

It aired on June 9, 2008 until October 23, 2008 on Venezuela via Venevisión Plus at the 10pm timeslot and reairing at the 1pm timselot.

Plot
Daniela and Gabriel meet by accident and sparks fly between them in spite of the fact that they are both already romantically involved. Daniela has been going out with Ricardo for years, but he is still not willing to commit to marriage, and is consistently unfaithful and while Gabriel is engaged to Raquel, what he feels for her is not really love, but lust. He has stayed in the relationship under pressure from his godmother Angela who, for selfish reasons that will be revealed later on, insists on having him to marry Raquel.

Although Gabriel inherited an enormous fortune after the death of his parents, he cares very little about money and position, and devotes his time to his greatest passion, radio, hosting a highly rated late night show. Sincerely interested in Daniela, he conceals his wealth and moves to the middle-class neighborhood where she lives, in order to be close to her.

Cast
 
 Scarlet Ortiz as Daniela Álvarez de Alcázar / Bárbara Rodena de Borgia
 Jorge Aravena as Gabriel Alcázar
 Roberto Palazuelos as Aristeo Borgia Rodena
 Paola Toyos as Raquel Aristizábal Ozora
 Julieta Rosen as Ángela Borgia
 Sebastian Ligarde as Alan Robinson / George Smith
 Hector Soberon as Lucho
 Mauricio Aspe as Ricardo
 Jorge Luis Pila as Carlos "Charlie" Rosendo
 Fernando Carrera as Manuel Borgia
 Franklin Virguez as Jorge Flores
 Tatiana Capote as Susana Alvarez
 Leonardo Daniel as Andrés Borgia / Mario Álvarez
 Alicia Plaza as Adela Ozora Vda. de Aristizábal
 Maritza Bustamante as Beatriz "Betty" Esparza
 Andres Garcia as Lorenzo
 Carmen Daysi Rodriquez as Renee
 William Levy as Federico
 Alejandra Graña as Rosalinda
 Adrian Mas as Enrique Alvarez
 Carla Rodriguez as Rita
 Marianne Lovera as Deby de la Fuente
 Jolly Dominguez as Amparo
 Julio Capote as Lucas Malpica

References

External links

2006 American television series debuts
2006 American television series endings
2006 telenovelas
2006 Venezuelan television series debuts
2006 Venezuelan television series endings
Television shows set in Miami
Television shows filmed in Miami
Spanish-language American telenovelas
Venevisión telenovelas
Venezuelan telenovelas
Univision telenovelas
American telenovelas